Victor Castro (born July 21, 1975) is a boxer from Argentina, who won the gold medal in the Light Welterweight (– 63.5 kg) at the 1999 Pan American Games in Winnipeg, Manitoba, Canada.

Castro defeated Kelson Pinto in the final. He represented his native country at the 2000 Summer Olympics in Sydney, Australia.

Nicknamed El Negrito, he made his professional debut in 2001, but has shown little power so far and has accumulated four losses.

Professional boxing record 

|-
| style="text-align:center;" colspan="8"|31 Wins (13 knockouts), 7 Loss, 1 Draws
|-  style="text-align:center; background:#e3e3e3;"
|  style="border-style:none none solid solid; "|Res.
|  style="border-style:none none solid solid; "|Record
|  style="border-style:none none solid solid; "|Opponent
|  style="border-style:none none solid solid; "|Type
|  style="border-style:none none solid solid; "|Rd.,Time
|  style="border-style:none none solid solid; "|Date
|  style="border-style:none none solid solid; "|Location
|  style="border-style:none none solid solid; "|Notes
|- align=center
|Win||31-7-1||align=left| Carlos Alberto Ibarra
|
|
|
|align=left|
|align=left|
|- align=center
|Win||30-7-1||align=left| Cesar Leonardo Telechea
|
|
|
|align=left|
|align=left|
|- align=center
|Draw||29-7-1||align=left| Mateo Damian Veron
|
|
|
|align=left|
|align=left|
|- align=center
|Loss||29-7||align=left| Ruslan Provodnikov
|
|
|
|align=left|
|align=left|
|- align=center
|Loss||29-6||align=left| Antonin Decarie
|
|
|
|align=left|
|align=left|
|- align=center
|Loss||29-5||align=left| Junior Witter
|
|
|
|align=left|
|align=left|
|- align=center
|Win||29-4||align=left| Rodolfo Ezequiel Martinez
|
|
|
|align=left|
|align=left|
|- align=center
|Win||28-4||align=left| Sergio Javier Benitez
|
|
|
|align=left|
|align=left|
|- align=center
|Loss||27-4||align=left| Juan Alberto Godoy
|
|
|
|align=left|
|align=left|
|- align=center
|Win||27-3||align=left| Nazareno Tripolli
|
|
|
|align=left|
|align=left|
|- align=center
|Win||26-3||align=left| Raul Zambrano
|
|
|
|align=left|
|align=left|
|- align=center
|Win||25-3||align=left| Guillermo de Jesus Paz
|
|
|
|align=left|
|align=left|
|- align=center
|Win||24-3||align=left| Adolfo Dionisio Rios
|
|
|
|align=left|
|align=left|
|- align=center
|Loss||23-3||align=left| Sergey Sorokin
|
|
|
|align=left|
|align=left|
|- align=center
|Win||23-2||align=left| Guillermo de Jesus Paz
|
|
|
|align=left|
|align=left|
|- align=center
|Win||22-2||align=left| Justo Evangelista Martinez
|
|
|
|align=left|
|align=left|
|- align=center
|Win||21-2||align=left| Vicente Luis Burgo
|
|
|
|align=left|
|align=left|

References
 
 

1975 births
Living people
People from San Cristóbal Department
Welterweight boxers
Boxers at the 1999 Pan American Games
Boxers at the 2000 Summer Olympics
Olympic boxers of Argentina
Argentine male boxers
Pan American Games gold medalists for Argentina
Pan American Games medalists in boxing
Medalists at the 1999 Pan American Games
Sportspeople from Santa Fe Province